Uenoidae is a family of stonecase caddisflies in the order Trichoptera. There are about 7 genera and at least 80 described species in Uenoidae.

Genera
These seven genera belong to the family Uenoidae:
 Farula Milne, 1936
 Neophylax McLachlan, 1871
 Neothremma Dodds & Hisaw, 1925
 Oligophlebodes Ulmer, 1905
 Sericostriata Wiggins, Weaver & Unzicker, 1985
 Thremma McLachlan, 1876
 Uenoa Iwata, 1927

References

Further reading

External links

 

Trichoptera families
Integripalpia